Megan Dirkmaat (born May 3, 1976) is an American rower. She was born in San Jose, California.

References 
 
 

1976 births
Living people
Sportspeople from San Jose, California
Rowers at the 2004 Summer Olympics
Olympic silver medalists for the United States in rowing
American female rowers
World Rowing Championships medalists for the United States
Medalists at the 2004 Summer Olympics